The 2006 Richard Luton Properties Canberra International was a tennis tournament played on outdoor hard courts. It was the 6th edition of the tournament, and part of the WTA Tier IV tournaments of the 2006 WTA Tour. It took place at the Domain Tennis Centre in Canberra, Australia, from 9 to 15 January 2006.

Singles main-draw entrants

Seeds

 1 Rankings are as of 2 January 2006

Other entrants 

The following players received wildcards into the singles main draw:
  Sophie Ferguson
  Shayna McDowell

The following players received entry from the qualifying draw:
  Eva Hrdinová
  Emma Laine
  Tatiana Poutchek
  Anastasia Rodionova

The following players received entry as a lucky loser:
  Emmanuelle Gagliardi
  Yvonne Meusburger

Withdrawals 
Before the tournament
  Marion Bartoli 
  Jelena Dokic
  Lucie Šafářová

Champions

Singles

 Anabel Medina Garrigues defeated  Cho Yoon-jeong, 6–4, 0–6, 6–4
 It was the 5th career WTA title for Medina Garrigues.

Doubles

 Marta Domachowska /  Roberta Vinci defeated  Claire Curran /  Līga Dekmeijere, 7–6(7–5), 6–3
 It was the 1st career WTA doubles title for Domachowska, while Vinci won her third title in the category.

References

External links
 Results on the ITF

 
Canberra
2006 in Australian sport
Tennis tournaments in Australia